Trifești may refer to several places in Romania:

 Trifești, Iași, a commune in Iași County
 Trifești, Neamț, a commune in Neamț County
 Trifești, a village in Horea Commune, Alba County
 Trifești, a village in Lupșa Commune, Alba County

and to:

Trifești, Rezina, a commune in Rezina district, Moldova

See also 
 Trifa (surname)
 Trifănești